The 2011–12 Oregon Ducks men's basketball team represented the University of Oregon during the 2011–12 NCAA Division I men's basketball season. The Ducks, led by their 2nd year head coach Dana Altman, are members of the Pac-12 Conference and played their first full season in Matthew Knight Arena, which opened in the middle of the previous season. They finished the season 24–10, 13–5 in Pac-12 play to finish in a tie for second place. They lost in the quarterfinals of the Pac-12 Basketball tournament to Colorado. They were invited to the 2012 National Invitation Tournament where they defeated LSU in the first round and Iowa in the second round before falling in the quarterfinals to fellow Pac-12 member and rival Washington.

Recruits
Source:

Roster

Schedule

|-
!colspan=6 style="background:#004F27; color:yellow;"| Exhibition

|-
!colspan=6 style="background:#004F27; color:yellow;"| Non-conference regular season

|-
!colspan=6 style="background:#004F27;"| Pac-12 regular season

|-
!colspan=6 style="background:#004F27; color:yellow;"| Pac-12 tournament

|-
!colspan=6 style="background:#004F27; color:yellow;"| NIT

References

Oregon Ducks men's basketball seasons
Oregon
Oregon
Oregon
Oregon